Reschbach (also: Reschwasser) is a river of Bavaria, Germany. Its source is on the border with the Czech Republic, close to the source of the Vltava. At its confluence with the Saußbach west of Freyung, the Wolfsteiner Ohe is formed.

See also
List of rivers of Bavaria

References

Rivers of Bavaria
Rivers of Germany